NAPS team  is an Italian independent video game studio based in Messina, Sicily. They work mostly in the home computer and console market.

History 
The company was established as a game developing house in 1993 by Fabio Capone and Domenico Barba.

Like many software houses established in the 1990s, their first market was on the 16-bit Amiga.

In 2016, the company started work on the game Iron Wings. The company used Kickstarter to raise funds. Completed in 2017, it features aerial warfare and is set in World War II.

In 2018, Gekido: Kintaro's Revenge was re-released for the Nintendo Switch, PlayStation 4 and Xbox One.

Reception
In 1996, Shadow Fighter was ranked the 20th best game of all time by Amiga Power.

Video games 
Games developed by NAPS team:
Shadow Fighter (Amiga, 1994, published by Gremlin Interactive) 
Gekido: Urban Fighters (PlayStation, 2000, Gremlin Interactive)
Gekido Advance: Kintaro's Revenge (Game Boy Advance, 2002)
 Rageball (2002)
Shoot (2002)
Football Madness (2003)
Silent Iron (2003)
 Omega Assault (2003)
 Flynig Squadron (2003)
 Hot Shot (2003)
 Wanted (2004)
 Jet Ace (2004)
 Shoot (2005)
Racing Fever (2005)
SWAT Siege (2006)
WWI: Aces of the Sky (2006)
WWII: Battle Over The Pacific (2008)
Sniper Assault (2006)
 Dead Eye Jim (2007)
 They Came From the Skies (2007)
 Apache Longbow Assault (2007)
 Operation Air Assault 2 (2007)
Twin Strike: Operation Thunder (2008)
Bootcamp Academy (2010)
Legendary Knight (2015)
Iron Wings (Xbox One, 2017)
Maria the Witch (PC, 2016, Xbox One, 2017, Nintendo Switch, PlayStation 4, 2018)
The Knight and the Dragon (Nintendo Switch, 2019)
Baldo (Nintendo Switch, PlayStation 4, Xbox One, PC, 2021)

See also 
 Gremlin Interactive: company founded by Ian Stewart that published Shadow Fighter

References 

Video game companies established in 1993
Italian companies established in 1993
Video game companies of Italy
Video game publishers
Video game development companies
Messina
Companies based in Sicily
Privately held companies of Italy